List of the published works of Sasha Frere-Jones, the writer and musician.

Essays and reporting
 
 
 
 
 
 
 
 
 
  Bands The Black Angels and Black Mountain on tour.
  LCD Soundsystem.
 
  'The endless inspiration of The Fall.'
  Electronic dance music.
  Rick Ross.
  Modeselektor
 
  Dawn of Midi.
  Kathleen Hanna and Bikini Kill.
  Rakim Mayers, aka A$AP Rocky.
  Thom Yorke and Atoms for Peace.
  The Music of Prince tribute concert at Carnegie Hall.
 
 
 
  The Joy Formidable.

Blog posts
  Sleigh Bells

Notes

Bibliographies by writer
Bibliographies of American writers